Selva de Pedra is a Brazilian telenovela produced and broadcast by TV Globo. It premiered on 24 February 1986 and ended on 22 August 1986, with a total of 160 episodes. It's the thirty fifth "novela das oito" to be aired on the timeslot. It is an adaptation of the 1972 telenovela of the same name created by Janete Clair and developed by Regina Braga and Eloy Araújo. The remake is directed by Walter Avancini.

Cast

References

External links 
 

TV Globo telenovelas
1986 telenovelas
Brazilian telenovelas
1986 Brazilian television series debuts
1986 Brazilian television series endings
Brazilian LGBT-related television shows
Portuguese-language telenovelas